There have been two baronetcies created for persons with the surname Curtis, one in the Baronetage of Great Britain and one in the Baronetage of the United Kingdom. One creation is extant as of 2007.

The Curtis Baronetcy, of Gatcombe in the County of Southampton, was created in the Baronetage of Great Britain on 10 September 1794 for the naval commander Admiral Sir Roger Curtis, 1st Baronet. The title became extinct on the death of the fourth Baronet in 1954.

The Curtis Baronetcy, of Cullands Grove, Southgate in the County of Middlesex, was created in the Baronetage of the United Kingdom on 23 December 1802 for Sir William Curtis, 1st Baronet, the son of a wealthy London biscuit manufacturer. He was member of parliament for the City of London from 1790 to 1818 and 1820 to 1826 and Lord Mayor of London from 1794 to 1795. He was later offered a peerage but declined. The third Baronet moved the family seat to Caynham Court, Caynham, Shropshire in 1852 and was High Sheriff of Shropshire in 1857. The fourth and fifth Baronets were both succeeded by cousins. The Shropshire estate was sold following the death of the sixth Baronet. The family seat is now at Bishops Waltham, Hampshire

Several other members of the family have also gained distinction. William Frederick Curtis, eldest son of Timothy Abraham Curtis, third son of the first Baronet, was a lieutenant-general in the Army. Arthur Cecil Curtis, second son of George Lear Curtis, second son of the second Baronet, was a rear-admiral in the Royal Navy. His son Arthur Drury Curtis (1888–1950) was a brigadier in the Army. Reginald Curtis, third son of Charles Berwick Curtis, fourth son of the first Baronet, was a major-general in the Army and his eldest son, Sir Reginald Salmond Curtis (1863–1922) was a major-general in the Army and awarded a knighthood as KCMG for services in the Great War. Berwick Curtis (1876–1965), youngest son of Charles Berwick Curtis, was a vice-admiral in the Royal Navy.

Curtis baronets, of Gatcombe (1794)
Sir Roger Curtis, 1st Baronet (died 1816)
Sir Lucius Curtis, 2nd Baronet (1786–1869)
Sir Arthur Colin Curtis, 3rd Baronet (1858–1898).
Sir Roger Colin Molyneux Curtis, 4th Baronet (1886–1954)

Curtis baronets, of Cullands Grove (1802)
Sir William Curtis, 1st Baronet (1752–1829)
Sir William Curtis, 2nd Baronet (1782–1847)
Sir William Curtis, 3rd Baronet (1804–1870)
Sir William Michael Curtis, 4th Baronet (1859–1916)
Sir Edgar Francis Egerton Curtis, 5th Baronet (1875–1943)
Sir Peter Curtis, 6th Baronet (1907–1976)
Sir William Peter Curtis, 7th Baronet (1935–2014)
Sir Edward Philip Curtis, 8th Baronet (born 1940)

The heir apparent is the current holder's eldest son, George Edward Curtis (born 1980).

Notes

References
Kidd, Charles, Williamson, David (editors). Debrett's Peerage and Baronetage (1990 edition). New York: St Martin's Press, 1990, 

Baronetcies in the Baronetage of the United Kingdom
Extinct baronetcies in the Baronetage of Great Britain
1794 establishments in Great Britain